Melora Walters (born October 21, 1959) is an American actress. She is best known for her starring roles as Wanda Henrickson in the television series Big Love and Kathy Kone in PEN15, and has appeared in several Paul Thomas Anderson films.

Personal life
She married cinematographer Alex Vendler on June 21, 2008. She filed for divorce in 2010. She has two children from her previous marriage with Dylan Walsh. Some of her filmmaking influences are Ingmar Bergman, Federico Fellini, François Truffaut, John Cassavetes and Jean-Luc Godard.

Career
Walters directed and wrote the script for the film Waterlily Jaguar. She starred in an episode of Law & Order: Special Victims Unit.

Filmography

Film

Television

References

External links

1959 births
Actresses from Illinois
American film actresses
American stage actresses
American television actresses
Living people
Lake Forest Academy alumni
People from Lake Forest, Illinois
20th-century American actresses
21st-century American actresses
People from Dhahran
American expatriates in the Netherlands
American expatriates in Saudi Arabia
Film directors from Illinois